Learn & Burn  is the third studio album from Canadian rock band The Sheepdogs, originally released in 2010, and re-released on May 22, 2011. The album peaked at number 14 on the Canadian Albums Chart.

The album won the award for Rock Album of the Year at the 2012 Juno Awards. The album's first single, "I Don't Know", won the Juno Award for Single of the Year. On February 5, 2013, the album was certified Platinum in Canada.

Track listing 
All songs written by Ewan Currie.

Side one

Side two

CD bonus tracks

Awards and nominations

References

External links 
 

2011 albums
The Sheepdogs albums
Juno Award for Rock Album of the Year albums